Advertisements in schools is a controversial issue that is debated in the United States. Naming rights of sports stadiums and fields, sponsorship of sports teams, placement of signage, vending machine product selection and placement, and free products that children can take home or keep at school are all prominent forms of advertisements in schools.

Types of Advertisements in Schools

Buses 
Many state laws permit advertising to be sold on the exterior and fewer permit advertising on the interior of school buses. However, many of these laws prohibit ads for political speech, tobacco, alcohol, gambling, drugs, or material of sexual nature.

Free Products 
Restaurant and fast-food chains frequently offer free treats in the form of coupons to students who receive good grades or have good attendance on their report card. In certain districts, free cell phones are offered to students who receive text messages from companies promoting academic success. Additionally, educational materials are donated to classrooms as a way to support a curriculum. Oftentimes these materials contain the company's logo or views that are subjective to the company.

Media 
Channel One News is a program designed for and broadcast to elementary, middle and high school students. It contains commercial advertising. Its advertising regulations have changed over the years and currently restrict advertisements related to food and beverages that are inconsistent with their healthy lifestyle initiatives, gambling, motion pictures above PG-13, politics, religion, and tobacco or alcohol products.

Sponsorship 
Sponsorship of school sports teams and fields or stadiums is common. Many high school teams have received uniforms, shoes, and funding for upkeep of their stadiums or fields in exchange for naming rights or the team wearing the sponsor's logo. Companies will also offer discounts to the team members they are sponsoring as a way to push sales.

Sponsorship also comes in the form of funds given to have the company's logo put on report cards and supply lists. Companies know back-to-school time is a great time to increase profit. By putting their marketing material on school supply lists it encourages parents to shop at their stores instead of others.

Vending machine products 

Food and beverage companies spend on average $150 million each year advertising in schools. Many of the drinks and foods are advertised and made available through vending machines. Even with regulations on what types of foods are allowed to be sold and marketed, the food and drink companies are still able to advertise their brand to students.

Arguments in favor of advertising
According to some school administrators, states have cut funding for K-12 education consistently for the last eight years causing many districts to cut jobs, increase class size, and cut spending on supplies. Using advertisements in schools is a way to raise money for school districts. According to proponents, schools, especially in less affluent areas, need ways to raise money in order to keep school programs alive and alleviate the financial burden presented by the funding cuts.

An argument in favour of junk food advertising is that children should be made aware of the nature of marketing strategies from a young age so that they become discerning consumers. Instead of banning the ads, the child should be capable enough of making a choice.

Another argument is that some advertisements may create a positive correlation to a healthy diet or lifestyle products.

Arguments against advertising
According to critics, many advertisements endorse products that are detrimental to children's health, such as unhealthy food, and some people argue that children are more easily drawn to persuasive advertisements than adults. It has also been argued that schools should be environments where students will not be distracted from their work by advertisements.

Channel One News has 2 minutes of advertising for every 12 minutes of news. Students can lose up to a full day of class time over a year for advertisements.

There is a concern that children do not understand the motivation behind ads. Children under the age of 13 are a vulnerable population that lacks the executive functioning skills to comprehend what the advertisement is trying to sell and the techniques used to persuade and frame customer decisions.  Children do not possess the same knowledge of advertising tactics as adults and are more susceptible to their persuasive intent. Elementary school children are not necessarily able to comprehend the fact that advertising agencies may have a different perspective from their own.

Restrictions on Advertisements 
Each state in the United States of America can define additional regulations for advertising in its local schools.

The National School Lunch and School Breakfast Programs: Nutrition Standards for All Foods Sold in School, as Required by the Healthy, Hunger-Free Kids Act of 2010 was updated in 2013 to reform school lunch options. This placed restrictions on what could be served in vending machines and sold on school grounds, with the exception of fundraisers (often candy bars or doughnuts) and after-school events.

This caused a shift in advertising for many companies as it phased out advertising of sugary drinks and junk foods. While the Coca-Cola Company would not be able to advertise Coca-Cola, it can advertise other product lines such as Diet Coke and Dasani.

In 2006 the Children's Food and Beverage Advertising Initiative was implemented by the Council of Better Business Bureaus as a way to encourage corporations to regulate what they advertise to children. It is not required for businesses to participate in this regulation and there are no legal ramifications if corporations do not participate.

Corporations that Advertise in Schools 
 Adidas
 Apple
 Air Force Academy
 Air Force Reserve
 Almond Board of California
 Army Reserve
 Bank of America
 Chef Boyardee
 Chicklets
 Citibank
 Clearasil
 Cliff Notes
 Coca-Cola Company
 Colgate
 CollegeInvest
 Crest
 CVS
 ESPN
 First National Bank
 Fleet/Norstar Financial Group
 General Foods
 General Foods Birds Eye
 Gerber
 Giftmaster Inc.
 Goodyear
 Hershey's
 Huffy
 Hyatt Regency
 Ikea USA Inc
 Image Photography
 InPro Corp
 KBUN Radio
 Kodak
 McDonald's
 M&M's
 Nestlé Waters
 Nike, Inc.
 NutraSweet
 Pepsi
 Polaroid
 Pony Sneakers
 Procter & Gamble
 Promise Spread
 Reebok Pump
 Reynolds Wrap
 RPM International
 Russell Athletic
 Security State Bank
 SI for Kids Gear
 ShopRite Supermarkets
 Smith Corona
 Snapple
 Speedo
 Stay Free
 Staples Inc.
 Strength System Footwear
 Subway
 Sugar Daddy
 Super 8 Motel
 Sure & Natural
 Tampax
 Target Corporation
 The Market Place
 Time Warner
 Toys ‘R’ Us
 U.S. Navy
 Verizon Wireless
 Women's Sports Foundation

See also
 Marketing in schools
 Consumerism

References

Education in the United States